Dinner with Racers is a motorsports podcast and online streaming show sponsored by Continental Tire and hosted by racing driver Ryan Eversley and Sean Heckman. The duo travel across the United States to interview other racing drivers, team owners, engineers, and general motorsports personalities over dinner. The show has featured individuals from various motorsports series including NASCAR, IndyCar, and WeatherTech SportsCar Championship. Each episode closes with music, occasionally from indie bands. Dinner with Racers has been picked up by online streaming platform Amazon Prime Video.

Season 1
Season 1 of Dinner with Racers saw the duo driving around the country in Eversley's Acura MDX, equipped with Continental Tires. The series quickly gained a cult following due to the diverse guest list and quality of the conversations the hosts had. The atmosphere of recording the podcasts over dinner allowed for listeners to feel as if they were also at the dinner table. Highlights of the season include Sean calling motorsports commentator Bob Varsha an "asshole", and spreading the unsubstantiated rumor that Spencer Pumpelly killed a guy.

Season 2
After the success of the original season, Eversley and Heckman were approached by Continental about the possibility of creating a follow up season. Announced on Twitter, the Dinner with Racers team allowed fans to ride along with them as they traveled across the country in a Honda Odyssey, significantly increasing their social media sharing and promotion as they visited guests. The second season once again included a great mix of sports car drivers, team owners, and engineers, while also expanding into the world of NASCAR, with guests such as Ricky Stenhouse Jr., Landon Cassill, Kenny Wallace and Marty Smith. A major theme of the series was Bill Riley of Riley Technologies, who was a guest host of the podcast in cardboard form. Bill Riley's performance during the season was considered.. flat. The team also created a music video in his honor. This season spread the unsubstantiated rumor that Johnny O'Connell tried to murder Dario Franchitti.

Season 3
Season Three saw the duo cross 25 states and 13,000 miles for 29 new episodes with racers from a number of different series including Dario Franchitti, Tony Stewart, Shane Hmiel, Mario Andretti, Jeremy Mayfield, Scott Dixon, and Josef Newgarden. This season also was the first to allow fans to suggest guests, resulting in appearances from several fan suggestions. Highlights include insisting Dario was responsible for driving Eversley and Heckman this season, quoting Dale Earnhardt's refusal to return to "the mill", and referring to significant screwups as "pulling a Gunselman"

Prime video show
Dinner with Racers has been picked up as an online streaming show by Amazon Prime Video. The podcast will continue alongside the streaming show. The first episode debuted on November 21, 2019 with a unique story of the Jamaican motorsports scene. Episode two and three debuted the following day on November 22 and includes episodes about Smokey Yunick and Bobby Unser.

Episode list

Dinner with Racers

Dinner with Racers 2

Dinner with Racers 3

Dinner with Racers 4

Dinner with Racers 5

Dinner with Racers 6

Dinner with Racers 7

Dinner with Racers 8

References 

Auto racing mass media
Automobile podcasts
Sports podcasts
2015 podcast debuts
Motorsport mass media in the United States